Constantin Guys (born Ernest-Adolphe Guys de Saint-Hélène, December 3, 1802 – December 13, 1892) was a French Crimean War correspondent, water color painter and illustrator for British and French newspapers.

Biography
Guys was born and baptized in Vlissingen, the son of François Lazare Guys and his second wife, Elisabeth Bétin. His father had been appointed civilian chief of the French Navy in Rochefort in 1795 and was stationed in Vlissingen from 1800 until 1806, after which the family moved to Calais. At the age of 20, Constantin served in the cavalry, but only a little later toured in Greece with Lord Byron. His career as an artist didn't start until he was about 40.

Baudelaire called him the "painter of modern life," and wrote a long essay on Guys in which he extensively praised his works, under the pseudonym "Monsieur G". Robert de Montesquiou wrote a review of Guys that acknowledged Baudelaire's essay, compared Guys favorably to Whistler, and emphasized his portrayal of details of women's clothing, and horse carriages. His subjects were Second French Empire life. In the Dutch novel "Au pair" by W. F. Hermans, one of the main characters is fascinated by Constantin Guys. Guys died in Paris, aged 90.

Works 
 Les Champs Élysées, 1922, Pavillon de Marsan du musée du Louvre, L'Illustration n°4123, 10/06/1922.
 Promenade en carosse, 1863 ca., plume, encre, aquarel sur papier beige, 255 x 339 mm, Museo Cantonale d'Arte de Lugano

References

Further reading
 Constantin Guys, 1802-1892. [Exhibition] June–July 1956. London: Marlborough Fine Art, Ltd.
 Geffroy, Gustave (1920). Constantin Guys, l'historien du Second Empire. Paris: G.Crès. (read online)
 Koella, Rudolf (1989). Constantin Guys. [Winterthur] : Kunstmuseum Winterthur.
 Roger-Marx, Claude (1954). Constantin Guys, 1802-1892. Paris: Braun.
 Smith, Karen, W. (1978). Constantin Guys. Crimean War Drawings 1854-1856. Cleveland (Ohio): Cleveland Museum of Art.

Sources
 Artcyclopedia article on Constantin Guys
 Merriam-Webster's Biographical Dictionary. Merriam-Webster Incorporated, 1995. in Biography Resource Center. Farmington Hills, Mich.: Thomson Gale. 2007. Document Number: K1681154772. Online. November 6, 2007

1802 births
1892 deaths
19th-century French painters
19th-century war artists
French male painters
French war artists
French war correspondents
French watercolourists
French philhellenes in the Greek War of Independence
People from Vlissingen
19th-century French male artists